Missouri Medicine is a bimonthly peer-reviewed medical journal that was established in 1904 and is published by the Missouri State Medical Association.

Abstracting and indexing
The journal is abstracted and indexed in Scopus and Index Medicus/MEDLINE/PubMed.

Editorship and history
The journal was established in 1904. Former editors-in-chief include Jordan W. Burkey (1982-1988), Donald G. Sessions (1988-1992), and J. Regan Thomas (1992-2000). The current editor is John C. Hagan, III.

References

External links

Publications established in 1904
General medical journals
English-language journals